North Cherry Street Historic District is a national historic district located at Kernersville, Forsyth County, North Carolina.  The district encompasses 10 contributing residential buildings in Kernersville.  They include dwellings built between about 1900 and 1930 in a variety of popular architectural styles including Colonial Revival, Italianate, and Bungalow / American Craftsman style.

It was listed on the National Register of Historic Places in 1988.

References

Houses on the National Register of Historic Places in North Carolina
Historic districts on the National Register of Historic Places in North Carolina
Italianate architecture in North Carolina
Colonial Revival architecture in North Carolina
Houses in Forsyth County, North Carolina
National Register of Historic Places in Forsyth County, North Carolina